This is a list of media in Quebec City, Quebec, Canada.

Radio

Internet Radio
 Radio Pirate - French, Jeff Fillion Talk

Defunct radio stations in Quebec City
Over the years a number of radio stations in Quebec City and areas were shut down.

Television

CBC Television once operated CBVE-TV, a rebroadcaster of Montreal's CBMT serving Quebec City.  In 1997, it took over the old channel 5 position previously occupied by longtime private affiliate CKMI-TV when the latter station switched to Global and moved to channel 20. CBVE-TV would relocate to channel 11 in 2011, after CBVT had shut down its analogue transmitter.  However, CBVE-TV was shut down in 2012 along with all CBC-operated rebroadcasters.  However, few anglophones lost access to CBC Television programming due to the wide availability of cable and satellite in the city.

Montreal's CFCF-DT (CTV) is piped in via cable.  American television stations are piped in from the Burlington, Vermont/Plattsburgh, New York market.

Print
Quebec City's main newspapers are the tabloids Le Soleil, Le Journal de Québec. It until recently had Voir which has since only distributed in Montreal, Quebec. The Quebec Chronicle-Telegraph, a weekly English community paper, is also published. It claims to be North America's oldest newspaper, in existence since 1764.

References

 
Quebec
Media, Quebec City